Zločin a trik II. is a 1967 Czechoslovak film. The film starred Josef Kemr.

References

External links
 

1967 films
Czechoslovak comedy films
1960s Czech-language films
Czech comedy films
1960s Czech films